Henry Alexander Gordon Howard, 4th Earl of Effingham, DL (15 August 1866 – 6 May 1927), styled Lord Howard from 1889 to 1898, was an English peer and member of the House of Lords. He inherited the earldom from his father, Henry Howard, 3rd Earl of Effingham in 1898.

Effingham was a Deputy Lieutenant of the West Riding of Yorkshire. He was a Liberal Unionist in politics. He was succeeded in the earldom by his first cousin, Gordon Howard, 5th Earl of Effingham.

References

External links

1866 births
1927 deaths
19th-century British people
20th-century British people
Deputy Lieutenants of the West Riding of Yorkshire
Earls in the Peerage of the United Kingdom
Henry Howard, 04th Earl of Effingham
Earls of Effingham
Liberal Unionist Party peers
Barons Howard of Effingham